The 1986 Miller High Life 400 was a NASCAR Winston Cup Series race that was held on February 23, 1986, at Richmond Fairgrounds Raceway (now Richmond Raceway) in Richmond, Virginia.

Almost the entire grid was born in the United States of America; Canadian Trevor Boys was the only foreigner. Individual winnings for this event ranged from the winner's share of $37,880 ($ when adjusted for inflation) to the last-place share of $2,515 ($ when adjusted for inflation); the total prize purse stood at $225,435 ($ when adjusted for inflation).

Richmond was a .542 symmetrical oval until 1988. Just after the Pontiac Excitement 400, the first big steps were taken to transform RIR into the 3/4-mile tri-oval we know today. That's why the grandstands were so far away from guardrail; reconfiguration had already begun.

Background
In 1953, Richmond International Raceway began hosting the Grand National Series with Lee Petty winning that first race in Richmond.  The original track was paved in 1968.  In 1988, the track was re-designed into its present D-shaped configuration.

The name for the raceway complex was "Strawberry Hill" until the Virginia State Fairgrounds site was bought out in 1999 and renamed the "Richmond International Raceway".

Race report
31 of 35 entered drivers qualified for this race. The drivers who failed to qualify were: Johnathan Lee Edwards, Alan Kulwicki, and Ronnie Thomas. Eddie Bierschwale would be the first car out of the race. Kyle Petty would defeat Joe Ruttman in his 1986 Ford Thunderbird, finishing under caution in front of twenty-five thousand fans. On the final lap, Darrell Waltrip and Dale Earnhardt tangled, causing a 5-car pileup. Running second at the time was Ruttman, who led for 100 feet before spinning out due to hitting the apron while trying to avoid the pile-up. This allowed Kyle to prevail. It was a win that was oddly similar to his father's 1979 Daytona 500 win in that the two competitors running 1-2 wrecked and the winner capitalized. This was also the only time since 1968 that a Wood Brothers car visited victory lane without the famed #21 vehicle.

Despite having the most wins at the track, Petty vigorously disliked the half-mile and preferred the  more traditional short track racing venues of the 1960s and the 1970s. Richard Petty would finish in 20th place at this race despite qualifying in 27th place.

Earnhardt dominated the NASCAR Winston Cup Series from 1986 to 1995; and his third-place finish at this race proved that he could be dominant on almost any track during the 1980s and the 1990s. Looking at the wins after this wreck between Dale and Darrell, this was the turning point of their "rivalry". Earnhardt took off and never looked back while Waltrip's competitiveness dwindled up until his retirement in 2000.

Considered to be a classic short track race typical of the 1980s, it had a great finish as well as a first-time winner. Dale Earnhardt dominated the middle section of the race by leading for 128 laps, but crashed with Darrell Waltrip in the closing laps after a controversial fender-banging duel. Earnhardt and Waltrip's battle was considered daring enough for Dale to stick Darrell's car head-on into the guardrail. Dale Earnhardt was really hounding Geoff Bodine for the lead early in this race. At one point Earnhardt got the dirt off Turn 2 and the back end kicked out on him but he held on and not only didn't spin the Wrangler #3 Chevy but saved it, didn't lose a spot, and didn't really lose a spot as he went right back to hunting Bodine.

NASCAR was more about raw skill, determination, and grit during the 1980s instead of luck-based strategies. Even if some of the changes made to NASCAR during the 21st century weren't implemented, the natural evolution of the sport would make it look vastly different compared to the 1980s. This race had no pit road speed, race back to the caution, and was still scored by hand. Richard Childress was a minor figure in NASCAR history until Dale Earnhardt came along and provided him with this powerful performance to make him a dominant team owner in NASCAR.

Terry Labonte came into the pits with what he thought was an engine failure and pulled the #44 Piedmont Airlines Oldsmobile behind the wall to retire it. A pit crew member checked the car and found a piece of metal was screwing with the ignition and once he removed it the car refired, running fine. Texas Terry jumped back in it, rejoined the race, and they still came away with a 15th-place finish at the end of the day. Doug Heveron was a late entry for this race but made the most of his one-off in Elmo Langley's signature #64 Ford. Heveron brought his T-Bird home 13th to match his career-best finish in Cup action. It was Petty's first NASCAR Winston Cup series victory and his only one on a short track.

After the race, Earnhardt had to pay a $3,000 fine ($ when adjusted for inflation) plus a $10,000 security bond for the late-race incident involving himself and Darrell Waltrip. Earnhardt was also placed on probation for the remainder of the season - the longest probation period ever given in the sport at the time. Earnhardt suffered a sore neck and blurred vision as a result of this incident. After the penalties were announced, Earnhardt appealed. On appeal, the infraction was reduced to a minor offense, with the $10,000 bond and probation period being overturned. However, the $3,000 fine was upheld. Geoffrey Bodine would lead the championship standings after this race with 332 points with Darrell Waltrip only two points behind him.

Notable crew chiefs in the race were Darrell Bryant, Kirk Shelmerdine, Robin Pemberton, Jeff Hammond, Tim Brewer, Bud Moore, Larry McReynolds, Dale Inman, Junie Donlavey among many others.

Qualifying results

Timeline
Section reference:
 Start: Geoffrey Bodine was leading the racing grid as the green flag was waved.
 Lap 2: Eddie Bierschwale wrecked his vehicle's engine to become the last-place finisher.
 Lap 10: Caution due to a 4-car accident on turn 2; caution ended on lap 13.
 Lap 15: Caution due to Lake Speed's accident on turn 1; caution ended on lap 17.
 Lap 17: Ricky Rudd and Phil Parsons managed to wreck their vehicle around the same time.
 Lap 18: Caution due to a multi-car accident on turn 3; caution ended on lap 35.
 Lap 29: Harry Gant managed to overheat his vehicle.
 Lap 59: Caution due to Kirk Bryant's accident on the front stretch; caution ended on lap 64.
 Lap 60: Dave Marcis took over the lead from Geoffrey Bodine.
 Lap 72: Jimmy Means took over the lead from Dave Marcis.
 Lap 75: Dale Earnhardt took over the lead from Jimmy Means.
 Lap 88: Kirk Bryant had a terminal crash.
 Lap 153: Caution due to a 2-car accident on turn 2; caution ended on lap 158.
 Lap 202: Caution due to Ken Schrader's accident on turn 4; caution ended on lap 209.
 Lap 203: Rusty Wallace took over the lead from Dale Earnhardt.
 Lap 204: Dale Earnhardt took over the lead from Rusty Wallace.
 Lap 272: Greg Sacks managed to spin his vehicle on the track; leading to a caution that ended on lap 277.
 Lap 273: Kyle Petty took over the lead from Dale Earnhardt.
 Lap 274: Dale Earnhardt took over the lead from Kyle Petty.
 Lap 279: Trevor Boys had a terminal crash.
 Lap 313: Problems with the vehicle's head gasket caused Michael Waltrip's day at the track to end prematurely.
 Lap 321: Caution due to a 2-car accident on turn 2; caution ended on lap 330.
 Lap 322: Darrell Waltrip took over the lead from Dale Earnhardt.
 Lap 323: Joe Ruttman took over the lead from Darrell Waltrip.
 Lap 344: Dale Earnhardt took over the lead from Joe Ruttman.
 Lap 397: Geoffrey Bodine had a terminal crash.
 Lap 398: Kyle Petty took over the lead from Dale Earnhardt; a 6-car accident occurred which forced the race to end under a caution flag.
 Finish: Kyle Petty was officially declared the winner of the event.

Finishing order
Section reference:

 Kyle Petty (No. 7)
 Joe Ruttman (No. 26)
 Dale Earnhardt (No. 3)
 Bobby Allison (No. 22)
 Darrell Waltrip* (No. 11)
 Bobby Hillin Jr. (No. 8)
 Neil Bonnett (No. 12)
 Geoffrey Bodine* (No. 5)
 Dave Marcis (No. 71)
 Rusty Wallace (No. 27)
 Jimmy Means (No. 52)
 Davey Allison (No. 95)
 Doug Heveron (No. 64)
 Buddy Arrington (No. 67)
 Terry Labonte (No. 44)
 J.D. McDuffie (No. 70)
 Lake Speed (No. 75)
 Ron Bouchard (No. 98)
 Greg Sacks (No. 10)
 Richard Petty (No. 43)
 Bill Elliott (No. 9)
 Tim Richmond (No. 25)
 Ken Schrader (No. 90)
 Tommy Ellis (No. 18)
 Michael Waltrip* (No. 23)
 Trevor Boys* (No. 6)
 Kirk Bryant* (No. 2)
 Harry Gant* (No. 33)
 Phil Parsons* (No. 17)
 Ricky Rudd* (No. 15)
 Eddie Bierschwale* (No. 48)

* Driver failed to finish race

Standings after the race

References

Miller High Life 400
Miller High Life 400
Miller High Life 400
NASCAR races at Richmond Raceway